Pharmaceutical Formulation Intermediates (or PFI) is a commercial terminology used for Direct Compressible (DC). It comprises a mixture of active substances and excipients, usually in powder form. PFI is slightly different from DC, as in PFI the mixture of active substances and excipients is formularized according to the requirement of the client. PFI is also an economic facility for the customers because it saves expenses incurred for R&D, manufacturing and supply chain.

Pharmaceutical industry